Richard Menschel (born c. 1935) is an American investment banker, art collector and philanthropist. He is a (retired) senior director of Goldman Sachs. Through the Charina Endowment Fund and the Charina Foundation, he supports art museums, schools and health charities. He won the 2015 Carnegie Medal of Philanthropy.

Early life
Richard Menschel was born circa 1935. His father, Benjamin Menschel, was a real estate investor. He has a brother, Robert Menschel, who also works for Goldman Sachs.

Menschel was educated at the Bronx High School of Science. He graduated from Syracuse University, and he earned a master in business administration from the Harvard Business School in 1959. He was a lieutenant in the United States Air Force.

Business career
Menschel worked at Goldman Sachs for 25 years. He was a partner by the mid-1970s, and served on its management committee. He retired as senior director in 1988. When Goldman Sachs became a public company in 1999, Menschel earned $20 million in shares.

Menschel also served on the board of directors of T. Rowe Price.

Philanthropy and political activity
Menschel was the managing director of the Horace W. Goldsmith Foundation, which became the Charina Endowment Fund in 1992. Through the Charina Endowment Fund, he has donated over $13 million. With his wife, Menschel also donates $1 million via the Charina Foundation. He has supported art museums like the Museum of Modern Art, the Jewish Museum and the Neue Galerie New York, and schools like Rockefeller University and the New York Law School. He also endowed the Horace W. Goldsmith Fellowship at the Harvard Business School and donated to the HBS Social Enterprise Initiative. He was the chairman of Hospital for Special Surgery, and he has donated to Memorial Sloan Kettering Cancer Center and the NewYork–Presbyterian Hospital. He is a vice president of the board of trustees of the Morgan Library & Museum. He was appointed to the New York City Panel for Educational Policy by mayor Michael Bloomberg in 2002.

With his brother Robert, Menschel received the Carnegie Medal of Philanthropy in 2015.

Personal life
Menschel married Ronay Arlt, then an assistant to Congressman Ed Koch and now the chairman of Phipps Houses. Their wedding was held at Menshel's mother's house, presided over by Rabbi Ronald B. Sobel of the Temple Emanu-El of New York. They have three daughters.

Menschel is also an art collector.

References

Living people
1930s births
Businesspeople from New York City
Military personnel from New York City
Syracuse University alumni
Harvard Business School alumni
American investment bankers
Goldman Sachs people
Philanthropists from New York (state)
American art collectors
New York (state) Democrats
Menschel family